Lying in one of the most seismically active regions of the world, Nepal has a long history of earthquakes. The first documented earthquake event in the country dates back to 7 June 1255, during the reign of King Abhaya Malla. The quake, measuring 7.8 on the Richter scale, took the life of the king and wiped out a third of Kathmandu's then population. Nepal has witnessed at least one major earthquake per century ever since.

The following is a list of earthquakes in Nepal. It includes only major seismic events with their epicentre in the country, and those that occurred outside the country, that resulted in a significant loss of life and property in the country.

List

See also
Geology of Nepal

References

Nepal

Earthquakes